The 2022 Coca-Cola 600, the 63rd running of the event, was a NASCAR Cup Series race held on May 29, 2022, Charlotte Motor Speedway in Concord, North Carolina. Contested over 413 laps – extended from 400 laps due to an overtime finish, on the  asphalt speedway, it was the 14th race of the 2022 NASCAR Cup Series season, as well as the third of the four crown jewel races.

Report

Background

The race was held at Charlotte Motor Speedway, located in Concord, North Carolina. The speedway complex includes a  quad-oval track that was utilized for the race, as well as a dragstrip and a dirt track. The speedway was built in 1959 by Bruton Smith and is considered the home track for NASCAR with many race teams based in the Charlotte metropolitan area. The track is owned and operated by Speedway Motorsports Inc. (SMI) with Marcus G. Smith serving as track president.

Similar to the Daytona 500, which was a four-stage race (with the first stage being the qualifying heat race), the Coca-Cola 600 is a four-stage race, with this the only race where all four stages are in the main race itself.  All four stages are scheduled to consist of 100 laps.  The race is official after the second stage.

Entry list
 (R) denotes rookie driver.
 (i) denotes driver who is ineligible for series driver points.

Practice

Practice results

Qualifying

Qualifying results

Race

Stage Results

Stage One
Laps: 100

Stage Two
Laps: 100

Stage Three
Laps: 100

Final Stage Results

Stage Four
Laps: 100

Race statistics
 Lead changes: 31 among 13 different drivers
 Cautions/Laps: 18 for 90
 Red flags: 2 for 12 minutes
 Time of race: 5 hours, 13 minutes and 8 seconds
 Average speed:

Media

Television
Fox Sports televised the race in the United States for the 22nd consecutive year. Mike Joy was the lap-by-lap announcer, while 2012 Fall Charlotte winner Clint Bowyer and two-time winner Jamie McMurray were the color commentators. Jamie Little, Regan Smith and Vince Welch reported from pit lane during the race. Larry McReynolds provided insight from the Fox Sports studio in Charlotte.

Radio
Radio coverage of the race was broadcast by the Performance Racing Network (PRN), and was simulcasted on Sirius XM NASCAR Radio. Doug Rice and Mark Garrow called the race in the booth when the field raced through the quad-oval. Rob Albright called the race from a billboard in turn 2 when the field was racing through turns 1 and 2 and halfway down the backstretch. Pat Patterson called the race from a billboard outside of turn 3 when the field raced through the other half of the backstretch and through turns 3 and 4. Brad Gillie, Brett McMillan and Alan Cavanna were the pit reporters during the broadcast.

Standings after the race

Drivers' Championship standings

Manufacturers' Championship standings

Note: Only the first 16 positions are included for the driver standings.
. – Driver has clinched a position in the NASCAR Cup Series playoffs.

References

Coca-Cola 600
Coca-Cola 600
Coca-Cola 600
NASCAR races at Charlotte Motor Speedway